Splinter, published in 2007, is a science fiction novel by the British writer Adam Roberts. It is based on an earlier story by the author, "Hector Servadac, fils", which was part of The Mammoth Book of Jules Verne Adventures. It is a reworking of Off on a Comet, an 1877 novel by Jules Verne. The hardcover edition of the novel is included in a slipcase with a hardcover edition of Off on a Comet.

Plot summary
As in Verne's novel, the main character is Hector Servadac, however, instead of being stranded on the comet while serving in the French Algerian army, his father is a supporter of a doomsday cult and Servadac is stranded on a splinter of the shattered Earth when the planet is destroyed by a comet. Roberts described the central metaphor as "the trope that the world might end and that we might not even be sure it has happened. We surely wouldn't be wholly oblivious (this is the end of the world we're talking about, after all!) But we might not be wholly certain, either. There would be a lengthy transition period during which we would become increasingly convinced that something substantial had changed in our lives."

Reception
In the SF Encyclopedia, John Clute described Splinter as an "enjoyable homage to and gloss upon the Verne novel."

References

External links
Roberts' official website

2007 British novels
2007 science fiction novels
British science fiction novels
Works by Adam Roberts (British writer)
Adaptations of works by Jules Verne
Novels about impact events
Fiction about comets
Solaris Books books